Emiliano Jonathan Iván Mayola (born 2 August 1987) is an Argentine professional footballer who plays as a centre-back for Brown de Adrogué.

Career
Mayola began with Banfield, prior to going to San Martín of Primera B Nacional in 2006. After no appearances in two years, Mayola left in 2008 to join Armenian Premier League side Gandzasar Kapan. A year later, the defender returned to Argentina after agreeing a move back to San Martín. Again, Mayola didn't feature for the club's first-team. Argentino of Primera C Metropolitana signed Mayola ahead of the 2010–11 campaign. Five goals in forty-two fixtures followed across the season. Mayola joined Primera B Metropolitana's Flandria in 2011. His first pro goal came on 30 April 2012 during a win versus Villa San Carlos.

After spending 2011–12 and 2012–13 with Flandria and making a total of seventy-six appearances whilst netting twice, Mayola was loaned to fellow third tier team Deportivo Morón. His first appearance arrived on 3 August 2013 against Los Andes, prior to his first goal coming in a 1–0 victory over Barracas Central on 27 August. Mayola was signed permanently on 30 June 2014, subsequently participating in one hundred and seventeen matches across four campaigns; with the last ending with promotion as champions to Primera B Nacional. After a lot years at Deportivo Morón, Mayola moved to Defensores de Belgrano in February 2021.

Ahead of the 2022 season, Mayola joined Brown de Adrogué.

Career statistics
.

Honours
Deportivo Morón
Primera B Metropolitana: 2016–17

References

External links

1987 births
Living people
Sportspeople from Buenos Aires Province
Argentine footballers
Association football defenders
Argentine expatriate footballers
Expatriate footballers in Armenia
Argentine expatriate sportspeople in Armenia
Primera B Metropolitana players
Primera Nacional players
San Martín de Tucumán footballers
FC Gandzasar Kapan players
Argentino de Merlo footballers
Flandria footballers
Deportivo Morón footballers
Defensores de Belgrano footballers
Club Atlético Brown footballers